Crème de Cerise (Cherry Cream) is a sweet French liqueur made from a blend of macerated dark and sour cherries. It is highly sugared (greater than 250 grams per liter), and relatively low in alcohol (18% ABV).

Brands
Some brands of crème de cerise are:
 Edmond Briottet Crème de Cerise
 Joseph Cartron Crème de Cerise de Bourgogne
 Paul Devoille Crème de Cerise Noir

References

Liqueurs
French liqueurs
Cherry liqueurs and spirits